Ladislav Maier (born 4 January 1966 in Boskovice) is a Czech former professional footballer who played as a goalkeeper. He played seven matches for the Czech Republic and participated at Euro 1996 and Euro 2000. At club level he took part in five Gambrinus liga seasons, playing his matches for Liberec.

Maier played for Austrian club Rapid Wien and was heavily critical of manager Lothar Matthäus, calling Matthäus "the biggest fool ever" and claiming that even the cleaners were pleased that Matthäus had left the club.

References

External links 
 
 
 
 Ladislav Maier at Rapid Vienna

1966 births
Living people
People from Boskovice
Czechoslovak footballers
Czech footballers
Association football goalkeepers
Czech Republic international footballers
UEFA Euro 1996 players
1997 FIFA Confederations Cup players
UEFA Euro 2000 players
Czech First League players
Austrian Football Bundesliga players
FK Drnovice players
FC Zbrojovka Brno players
FC Slovan Liberec players
SK Rapid Wien players
Czech expatriate footballers
Czech expatriate sportspeople in Austria
Expatriate footballers in Austria
Sportspeople from the South Moravian Region